The 2021 Army Black Knights football team represented the United States Military Academy in the 2021 NCAA Division I FBS football season. The Black Knights were led by eighth-year head coach Jeff Monken and played their home games at Michie Stadium. They competed as an independent. The Black Knights finished the season with a record of 9–4, sharing the Commander-in-Chief's Trophy with Navy and Air Force after all three service academies finished with 1–1 records against each other. They were invited to the Armed Forces Bowl where they defeated Missouri, 24–22.

Previous season

The Black Knights finished the 2020 season with a record of 9–3, winning the Lambert Trophy for the second time in three years, and winning the Commander-in-Chief's Trophy for the third time in four years following back-to-back victories over Navy and Air Force. They were invited to the Liberty Bowl where they were defeated by West Virginia, 21–24.

Preseason

Award watch lists

Listed in the order that they were released.

Personnel

Coaching staff

 Keith Gaither also served as the wide receivers coach at Army from 2015 to 2016
 Saga Tuitele also served as the offensive line coach at Army from 2007 to 2008.
 Tucker Waugh also served as the wide receivers coach at Army from 2000 to 2004.
 John Loose also served as the linebackers coach at Army from 1992 to 1999.
 Scott Swanson also served as an assistant strength & conditioning coach at Army from 1995 to 1996.

Source:

Roster

The Army football roster for the Week 1 game at Georgia State (as of August 30, 2021):

Depth chart

The Army football depth chart for the 2021 Lockheed Martin Armed Forces Bowl vs. Missouri (as of December 19, 2021):

Depth Chart 2021
True Freshman
Double Position : *

Schedule

Source:

Game summaries

at Georgia State

Western Kentucky

UConn

Miami (OH)

at Ball State

at Wisconsin

No. 16 Wake Forest

vs. Air Force

Bucknell

UMass

at Liberty

vs. Navy

The Army Black Knights camouflaged uniform honored the Special Forces Operational Detachment Alphas (ODAs) from the 5th Special Forces Group of Task Force Dagger. In the immediate wake of the 9/11 attacks, ODAs were called upon to rapidly deploy from Fort Campbell, Kentucky to Afghanistan. The uniforms also pay tribute to service members and veterans, marking not only the end of the "Forever War" in Afghanistan, but the 20-year anniversary of 9/11.

Each jersey features an Army patch and a mirror patch emblazoned with the words "De Oppresso Liber", which is Latin for "from being an oppressed man to being a free one.",  which is the motto for the Army Special Forces. The jerseys also has the collar devices worn by the Special Forces, showcasing crossed arrows and the letters U and S with "United We Stand" on the back of the jersey.

The helmets also bear the Special Forces crest and crossed arrows, an American flag, and unit insignia for the 160th Special Operations Aviation Regiment's Night Stalkers. The date of the 2001 terrorist attacks are located front and center. 

The cleats have a pentagon-shaped logo with the twin towers of the World Trade Center in red, white and blue.

vs. Missouri – Armed Forces Bowl

References

Army
Army Black Knights football seasons
Army Black Knights football
Armed Forces Bowl champion seasons